Russell James Hinze (19 June 1919 – 29 June 1991) was a politician in Queensland, Australia, in the 1970s and 1980s. He presided over an era of controversy that included the setting up of the Racing Development Fund, ministerial re-zonings and the licensing of Jupiters Casino. His career in public life spanned almost four decades, first in local government in the 1950s and 1960s, and then in the Queensland Legislative Assembly from 1966 to 1988. After his exit from Parliament he was charged with eight counts of corruption, but died before going to trial.

Early life
Russell James Hinze was born on 19 June 1919 in Oxenford on the Gold Coast of Queensland. His father was a dairy farmer.

He started his career as a sugar cane cutter. Later he took up dairy-farming; like his father.

Politics 
After becoming chairman of the South Coast Cooperative Dairy Association, he was elected to the Albert Shire Council in the early 1950s, serving as shire chairman for nine years from 1958 to 1967.

In 1966, Hinze entered the State political arena as the member for South Coast, representing the then Country Party. After eight years as a backbench member of the Coalition Government, he was promoted to Cabinet. In 1971, while still a backbencher, he was part of a plot within the Country Party parliamentary wing to topple Joh Bjelke-Petersen that failed only when Bjelke-Petersen  broke a tie in the party-room meeting by voting for himself.

Between 1974 and 1987, he served as the Minister for Local Government and Main Roads. Between 1980 and 1987, he served as the Minister for Racing. Between 1980 and 1982, he served as the Minister for Police. These ministerial positions earned him the commonly known title of 'Minister for Everything'.

In May 1988, Hinze resigned from Queensland Parliament after allegations were made against him during the Fitzgerald Inquiry, which was investigating corruption in Queensland during the Bjelke-Petersen era.

Later life
In December 1989, Hinze was charged on eight counts of having received corrupt payments totalling $520,000. However, before the case could go to trial, he died from bowel cancer on 29 June 1991, at the Allamanda Private Hospital in Southport, aged 72. He was buried in Lower Coomera cemetery on the Gold Coast.

After his death, Queensland Deputy Premier Tom Burns remembered him in parliament with the following anecdote: "The best cartoon of him was the one that showed him as a bulldog. I saw him on television describing why he would rather be a bulldog than a mouse, but he was shown as a bulldog with dark glasses and a white cane outside a casino and brothel in the Valley that had a flashing neon light, saying he did not know there were any there".

Although the charges against Hinze were never proven in court, a trial in 1990, arising from the Fitzgerald Inquiry, saw businessman George Herscu convicted of paying Hinze $100,000 to enable a shopping centre development to go ahead. Herscu claimed the payments were for Hinze to purchase racehorses for him.

Legacy
Hinze Dam was named in honour of local pioneers Carl and Johanna Hinze (grandparents of Russ Hinze) who lived in the valley that was flooded by the dam.

His granddaughter, Kristy Hinze, is a model.

References

Sources

External links

1919 births
1991 deaths
Members of the Queensland Legislative Assembly
History of Gold Coast, Queensland
National Party of Australia members of the Parliament of Queensland
People from the Gold Coast, Queensland
20th-century Australian politicians